7752 is the third album by Italian jazz vocalist Chiara Civello. The title gives the distance in kilometers from New York City to Rio de Janeiro, the two cities that inspired the album.

Background
While visiting her friend, Daniel Jobim, in Rio in February 2008, Civello was taken to a party where artists and musicians of all kinds get together. The guitar went around and everyone sang a song. As Civello shared, listened and learned, a new phase of her artistic path began. Ana Carolina, a Brazilian MPB star, is one of the main collaborators of 7752. Not only did she co-write five of the songs with Civello, but she also played acoustic guitar on most of them.

Written between Rio, New York, and Rome, 7752 includes ten musical moments of which eight were recorded in New York City (and produced by the eclectic producer Andres Levin), while four were recorded in Rio and produced by Civello.

Track listing

Personnel

 Chiara Civello – vocals, guitar, keyboards, programming, arranger
 Ana Carolina – vocals, guitar, cajon, programming, arranger
 Andres Levin – guitar, keyboards, programming, arranger
 Raymond Angry – keyboards
 Anat Cohen – clarinet, bass clarinet, saxophone
 Michael Leonhart – trumpet, horn arrangements
 Marc Ribot – guitar
 Guilherme Monteiro – guitar
 Diana Tejera – guitar
 Alberto Continentino – bass
 Jonathan Maron – bass
 Gene Lake – drums
 Domenico Lancellotti – drums
 Mauro Refosco – percussion
 Yusuke Yamamoto – bongos
 Marcio Eymard Malard – cello
 Jacques Morelembaum – cello, string arrangements
 Paulo Santoro – cello
 Bernardo Bessler – violin
 José Alves Da Silva – violin
 Glauco Fernandes – violin
 Carlos Eduardo Hack – violin
 Carlos Mendes – violin
 Pedro Mibielli – violin
 Leo Fabricio Ortiz – violin
 Osvaldo Luís Teodoro – violin
 Jesuina Noronha Passaroto – viola
 Maria Christine Springuel – viola

Production
 Chiara Civello – producer
 Ana Carolina – producer
 Andres Levin – producer
 Bob Power – mixing
 Sonia Martyres – producer

See also
La Llave de Mi Corazón - Juan Luis Guerra

References

External links
http://www.chiaracivello.com Official Website

2010 albums
Chiara Civello albums